Tarak is a 2017 Indian Kannada-language action drama film directed by Prakash and produced by Dushyanth. The film features Darshan, Sruthi Hariharan and Shanvi Srivastava in the lead roles. Devaraj, Kuri Prathap and Sumithra feature in important supporting roles. While the soundtrack and background score is by Arjun Janya, the cinematography is by A. V. Krishna Kumar. The first look of the film was released on 30 March 2017. and the film was released on 29 September 2017.

The project marks the first film in the combination of Darshan with Prakash of Milana fame and Darshan's 49th film to be released. The filming began on 1 March 2017 in Bengaluru. Further, the shooting took place in Malaysia and for the song sequences, the team moved to Switzerland and Italy.

Plot 
Tarak (Darshan) meets Meera (Shanvi Srivastava) who falls for him. Later he, too, reciprocates it. But one day she challenges him to live without her for two months – while no one should learn about them. Then, if he doesn't fall for others in that time, she will re-believe in him.  He goes back to India to meet his grandfather (Devaraj). Surprisingly they fix his marriage with Sneha (Shruti Hariharan) who lives with them and he must accept because his grandfather would die soon. He tells Sneha about Meera and she accepts his decision. They then live to Meera's house. There he sees Meera diseased and she challenges him so that he would not know about her disease. And she gets her father married again so that after her death he should not feel lonely. Tarak and Sneha get emotional.  Meera dies in the arms of Tarak. They return to India. Tarak says that he cannot marry her. So everybody plans that Tarak will act as he would tie Mangalsutra and actually Sneha's mother would tie. While tying Tarak remembers Meera's words,  "Other's happiness is important than ours". He feels a drop of tear fall on his hand, which is from the eyes of Sneha's mother. To everybody's surprise, Tarak himself ties the knot. Everybody is happy.
The film ends with Tarak, Sneha and Meera (Tarak's daughter) visiting Meera's burial place and making a video call to the family; and his grandfather is alive because of interest to see his great-granddaughter.

Cast

 Darshan as Tarak Ram
 Sruthi Hariharan as Sneha
 Shanvi Srivastava as Meera
 Devaraj as Tarak Ram, Tarak's Grandfather
 Sumithra as Sarasamma
Sharath Lohitashwa
 Kuri Prathap
 Sangeetha 
Avinash
Kuldeep
 Aravind Rao
 All Ok
 Master Mahendra
 Chitra Shenoy
 Jasmine Kaar (in the song "Kudi Maga")

Production

Filming
In November 2016, it was reported that the official launch for the Darshan's 49th venture with director Prakash would begin on 9 December 2016. Prakash, who was busy in the pre-production work, had already finalised the main technicians for the film. His brother-in-law Dushyanth who had earlier produced Milana and Shree was roped in to produce the film. Since Darshan was involved in the shoot for his previous venture, Chakravarthy, the team made the elaborate arrangements for the film to officially begin. The second schedule of the shoot took place in Malaysia. Following this, for some of the songs shoot, the unit moved to Switzerland and Italy.

Casting
After having worked with successful stars like Shiva Rajkumar, Puneeth Rajkumar and Vijay Raghavendra, Prakash had planned to work with Darshan and approached him with a new family entertainer script for which the actor readily agreed. His brother-in-law, K. S. Dushyanth, was ready to finance the project for the third time after Milana and Shree. Actress Sruthi Hariharan was approached to play one of the two female leads in the project. Newcomer Rashmika Mandanna was selected to play the second female lead role even before the release of her debut film, Kirik Party. Citing dates issues, Rashmika opted out from the project and Shanvi Srivastava was replaced in her place. Veteran actors Devaraj and Sumithra were selected to play the parent roles.

Soundtrack

Arjun Janya has composed the songs and the soundtrack. Soundtrack consists of 6 songs. V. Nagendra Prasad, Jayanth Kaikini and Hari Santhosh have penned the lyrics.

References

External links
 
 

2017 films
2010s Kannada-language films
2017 action drama films
Indian action drama films
Films scored by Arjun Janya
Films shot in Malaysia
Films shot in Switzerland
Films shot in Italy